Saint Hermas of Philippopolis was one of the Seventy Disciples and was bishop in Philippopolis in Thrace (today's Plovdiv, Bulgaria). Hermas, the author of The Shepherd of Hermas, was often identified with him, but that Hermas was a second-generation Christian and lived some time after this Hermas. He is mentioned in Romans 16:14, and his feast day is celebrated on May 31, on November 5 with Apostles Patrobas, Linus, Gaius, and Philologus, and on January 4 among the Seventy.

Life
He was wealthy, but fell into poverty because of sin and the sins of his sons. He was thus supposedly visited by an angel of repentance, who is said to have stayed with him until the end of his life, during which time he wrote The Shepherd of Hermas  He ended his life as a martyr.

Sources
St. Nikolai Velimirovic, The Prologue from Ohrid

External links
Biographical links
Apostle Hermas of the Seventy, January 4 (OCA)
Apostle Hermas of the Seventy, May 31 (OCA)
Apostle Hermes of the Seventy, November 5 (OCA)

Writings by Hermas
Early Christian Writings: The Shepherd of Hermas

References

Seventy disciples
Saints from Roman Greece
1st-century Christian martyrs
1st-century bishops in the Roman Empire
People from Plovdiv
Year of birth unknown
Angelic visionaries